Akazukin (赤ずきん?) is the Japanese name of the fairy tale story Little Red Riding Hood.

Akazukin may refer to:
Akazukin Chacha, shōjo manga series by Min Ayahana
Otogi-Jūshi Akazukin, anime series also known as "Fairy Musketeers Little Red Riding Hood"
Tokyo Red Hood, seinen manga series by Benkyo Tamaoki, also known as "Tokyo Akazukin"